Gangsta Grillz: The Album Vol. 2 is the second studio album by American hip hop disc jockey DJ Drama. It was released on May 19, 2009, by Grand Hustle Records and Atlantic Records.

Background
DJ Drama said this about the album.

Guest appearances on the album are T.I., Young Dro, Sean P, Lonnie Mac, Ludacris, Willie the Kid, Trey Songz, Gucci Mane, LA Da Darkman, Yung Joc, Bun B, Flo Rida, Mike Jones, Rick Ross, Trick Daddy,  Ray J, Akon,  Fabolous, Yo Gotti, OJ da Juiceman, Nas, Scarface, Marsha Ambrosius, The-Dream, Too Short, Styles P, Jovan Dais, Snoop Dogg, B.G., Juvenile, and Soulja Slim. The producers on the album are Drumma Boy, Tricky Stewart, Cordale "Lil C" Quinn, and DJ Khalil among others.

Singles
The first single, "Day Dreaming", was leaked on the internet on December 22, 2008. The song is produced by Drumma Boy and features Akon, Snoop Dogg,  and T.I.
The second single is "Ridiculous" produced by Zaytoven and features Gucci Mane, Yo Gotti, Lonnie Mac and OJ Da Juiceman.

Track listing
The following track list was confirmed by Atlantic Records via their online store.

Sales

The album sold 19,000 copies in its first week, and as of January 5, 2010 the album sold 41,022 copies.

Charts

References

DJ Drama albums
2009 albums
Atlantic Records albums
Albums produced by DJ Khalil
Albums produced by Tricky Stewart
Albums produced by Drumma Boy
Albums produced by Zaytoven
Albums produced by Nottz
Grand Hustle Records albums
Sequel albums
Albums produced by Lil' C (record producer)